Phantom Limb is the fourth studio album by the band Pig Destroyer, released on June 12, 2007 in the United States and June 18 in the rest of the world. The album was released on CD and LP. Vocalist JR Hayes said the line up of 14 songs are "the most deranged metal songs we could come up with". The album cover art was done by John Baizley.

Track listing

Personnel
Pig Destroyer
J. R. Hayes – vocals
Scott Hull – guitar, mixing, production
Brian Harvey – drums
Blake Harrison – samples, ambience

Production
Matthew F. Jacobson – executive producer
Orion Landau – artwork, design
John Baizley – cover art
Shannon Follin – engineer

References

External links
Album info

2007 albums
Pig Destroyer albums
Relapse Records albums
Albums with cover art by John Dyer Baizley